Panjarlu (also Romanized as Panjarlū) is a village in Chaybasar-e Shomali Rural District of Bazargan District of Maku County, West Azerbaijan province, Iran. At the 2006 National Census, its population was 740 in 118 households. The following census in 2011 counted 795 people in 157 households. The latest census in 2016 showed a population of 768 people in 206 households; it was the largest village in its rural district.

References 

Maku County

Populated places in West Azerbaijan Province

Populated places in Maku County